Sword of Chaos and Other Stories is an anthology of sword and planet short stories edited by Marion Zimmer Bradley. The stories are set in Bradley's fictional world of Darkover. The book was first published by DAW Books in April 1982.

Contents
 Introduction, by Marion Zimmer Bradley
 After Landfall
 "A Gift of Love" by Diana L. Paxson
 The Cycles of Legend
 "Dark Lady" by Jane Brae-Bedell
 "A Legend of the Hellers" by Terry Tafoya
 In the Hundred Kingdoms
 "In the Throat of the Dragon" by Susan Shwartz
 "Wind-Music" by Mary Frances Zambreno
 "Escape" by Leslie Williams
 "Rebirth" by Elisabeth Waters
 "A Sword of Chaos" by Marion Zimmer Bradley
 Between the Ages
 "Di Catenas" by Adrienne Martine-Barnes
 "Of Two Minds" by Susan Hansen
 "Through Fire and Frost" by Dorothy J. Heydt
 In the Days of the Comyn
 "The Way of a Wolf" by Lynne Holdom
 "Cold Hall" by Aly Parsons
 "The Lesson of the Inn" by Marion Zimmer Bradley
 "Confidence" by Phillip Wayne
 The Empire and Beyond
 "Camilla" by Patricia Mathews
 "Where the Heart Is" by Millea Kenin
 "Skeptic" by Lynn Mims
 "A Recipe for Failure" by Millea Kenin

References
 
 
 

Darkover books
1982 anthologies
American anthologies
Fantasy anthologies
Works by Marion Zimmer Bradley
DAW Books books